Ports O’ Call Village, located along the Port of Los Angeles main channel in San Pedro, was a seaside plaza that featured souvenir and gift shops, along with restaurants, sweetshops, fish markets and quick-bite eateries. This New England-style seaside village encompassed 15 acres of shops, restaurants and attractions. A meandering promenade of cobblestone streets connects the specialty shops.

History
Ports O' Call Village, branded as an "elaborately themed seaside entertainment venue", was conceived and built by David Tallichet in 1963, a World War II pilot-turned restaurateur who also built the Castaway and 94th Aero Squadron. Tallichet envisioned an eclectic mixture of international destinations knitted together with cobblestone pathways, strolling musicians and global cuisine.

Development
In 2013, the Los Angeles Board of Harbor Commissioners called for the redevelopment of the entire 30-acre waterfront site in the Port of Los Angeles that includes Ports O' Call Village. After a series of public meetings and extensive community input, in 2015, the Port of Los Angeles released its Public Access Investment Plan intended to create a sustainable and predictable approach to the Port's yearly investment in non-cargo related, public-serving projects and programs.

In March 2016, the Los Angeles Board of Harbor Commissioners approved a 50-year lease for the new San Pedro Public Market on the site. Plans for San Pedro Public Market include restaurants, shopping, fresh markets, office space and a waterfront promenade with outdoor space and an open-air amphitheater. Construction is expected to begin in 2017 at a partial project cost of $90 million, paid by the developer. The San Pedro Public Market is expected to open in 2020, with demolition beginning as early as November 2016.

, a public spokesperson at the Port of Los Angeles says it will be a couple more years until this development is open to the public. The development was named West Harbor in October 2020.

References

Ports and harbors of California
San Pedro, Los Angeles